Triel-sur-Seine (literally Triel on Seine) is a commune in the Yvelines department in the Île-de-France in north-central France.

The city is known for the "Fête du Flan", literally Flan Party, which takes place every last weekend of September on the banks of the Seine. This is a garage sale. The bakeries of the city have on this occasion several stands on which it is possible to consume flan. The city entered the Guinness Book in 1995 for having made the largest flan in the world (5.10 m in diameter).

Population

Inhabitants are known as Triellois or Trielloises according to gender.

Twin towns 

 Seligenstadt, located in the south-east of Frankfurt, twinned since 1967. Triel-Seligenstadt was elected "Jumelage emblème de l'amitié franco-allemande" (Twin towns symbol of the french-german friendship) in June 2013.

 Leatherhead, located in Surrey, England, twinned since 2004.

See also
Communes of the Yvelines department

References

Communes of Yvelines